Masharageh (also Romanized as Masharāgeh) is a village in Soviren Rural District, Cham Khalaf-e Isa District, Hendijan County, Khuzestan Province, Iran. At the 2006 census, its population was 699, in 150 families.

References 

Populated places in Hendijan County